KUTU (91.3-FM,  "91.3 The Blaze") is a radio station broadcasting a College, Variety. Licensed to Santa Clara, Utah, United States, the station is currently owned by Utah Tech University, formerly known as Dixie State University. 

Radio programming from Dixie State began in 2009, when a preview of KXDS' programming aired on KURR (103.1 FM) ahead of the launch of the 91.3 facility. The station was known as "Classical 91" and aired a classical music format. The classical format was dropped in 2012 as part of changes to increase student involvement.

In 2017, the university entered into a 10-year lease to expand to operating a low-power station in St. George, KDXI-LP 100.3. That station changed its call sign to KQUT-LP on June 29, 2022, in advance of Dixie State University changing its name officially to Utah Tech University on July 1. After reaching an agreement with the owner of KUTU-CD, a television station in Oklahoma, KXDS became KUTU on September 26, 2022.

References

External links
 
 
 

Utah Tech University
St. George, Utah
UTU
UTU
Radio stations established in 2009
2009 establishments in Utah